Evanston Davis Street is a commuter railroad station in downtown Evanston, Illinois. It is served by Metra's Union Pacific North Line with trains going south to Ogilvie Transportation Center in Chicago and as far north as Kenosha, Wisconsin. In Metra's zone-based fare system, Davis Street is in zone C. As of 2018, Evanston Davis Street is the 12th busiest of Metra's 236 non-downtown stations, with an average of 1,876 weekday boardings. The station is next to the Davis station of the Chicago Transit Authority's Purple Line, where CTA and Pace buses terminate. Between the two stations is 909 Davis Street, a six-story building with a kiss-and-ride loop for car drop-off.

Davis Street station, at Davis Street and Maple Avenue, has two elevated platforms. Northbound trains stop at the west platform and southbound trains stop at the east platform. The ticket agent's office is on the east platform. At ground level, there is a restaurant called Chef's Station. Just to the east of the Davis CTA station is the 12-story Sherman Avenue Garage.

As of April 25, 2022, Evanston Davis St. is served by all 35 trains in each direction on weekdays, by 12 trains in each direction on Saturdays, and by all nine trains in each direction on Sundays. During the summer concert season, the extra weekend train to  also stops here.

This is the closest Metra station to most of the buildings on Northwestern University's Evanston campus, with the exception of Ryan Field, which is closer to the  station.

History

When the Chicago & Milwaukee railroad, the predecessor of the Chicago and North Western Railway was built, there was only a single track. The stations were placed on the North side of tracks on the other C&NW West line, the original Chicago and Galena Union line. The station buildings were built on the side for inbound Chicago passengers.

The Davis Street station was the only stop in Evanston for intercity Chicago and North Western Railway trains, such as the Twin Cities 400. The Union Pacific bought the assets of the C&NW.

Transportation

The Davis Street Metra station is only steps west of the CTA station and, together with that station, forms a transportation center allowing easy transfer from one station to the other, there is also a pedestrian walkway.

Rail

CTA Purple Line
Davis

Bus

CTA
 93 California/Dodge (Monday–Saturday only) 
 201 Central/Ridge (Monday–Saturday only) 
 206 Evanston Circulator (school days only) 

Pace
 208 Golf Road 
 213 Green Bay Road
 250 Dempster Street

References

External links 
 
Metra - Evanston Davis Street
Chef's Station - Evanston, IL 60201 / Metromix Chicago
Davis Street entrance from Google Maps Street View
Church Street entrance from Google Maps Street View

Metra stations in Illinois
Former Chicago and North Western Railway stations
Davis Street (Metra)
Railway stations in the United States opened in 1910
Union Pacific North Line